Tropical Cyclone Honorinina was a powerful tropical cyclone that struck eastern Madagascar in March 1986. The eighth named storm of the season, Honorinina formed on March 9 to the south of Diego Garcia. It moved generally to the west-southwest due to a ridge to the south, gradually intensifying. On March 12, the Météo France office on Réunion (MFR) upgraded Honorinina to tropical cyclone status, which is the equivalent of a minimal hurricane. On the next day, the cyclone attained maximum sustained winds of  while in the vicinity of Tromelin Island. The storm weakened further over land, moving southwestward across the country. It emerged into the Mozambique Channel and became extratropical on March 18. Honorinina turned to the southeast, dissipating on March 23.

However, effects were worst in Madagascar, especially in Toamasina near where the storm made landfall. In Toamasina, the cyclone damaged the main port, the airport, and several warehouses, resulting in $17 million (1986 USD) of lost inventory. Thousands of houses were damaged, leaving 83,885 people homeless; a housing program earlier set up after Cyclone Kamisy in 1984 was extended to help storm victims after Honorinina. Nationwide, the cyclone killed 99 people and caused $150 million (1986 USD) in damage.

Meteorological history

On March 8, a circulation was observed southeast of Diego Garcia and was undergoing tropical cyclogenesis. On March 9, the Météo France office in Réunion (MFR) began tracking the storm in its database, and the Joint Typhoon Warning Center (JTWC) began classifying it as Tropical Cyclone 25S. The nascent tropical storm moved generally to the west-southwest, gradually intensifying.

After a trough passed eastward, a ridge developed south of Honorinina, which reinforced the southwest track toward Madagascar. While near peak intensity, Honorinina passed about 25 km (15 mph) south of Tromelin Island, and subsequently gradually weakened. It rapidly weakened to tropical depression status over land, and the JTWC discontinued advisories on March 16. The circulation continued southwestward through the island, emerging into the Mozambique Channel on the next day. Thereafter, Honorinina restrengthened slightly over open waters. However, the MFR declared the storm as extratropical on March 18, based on the satellite appearance. The JTWC again issued advisories on the next day, only to discontinue them on March 20. Meanwhile, the MFR tracked the cyclone as turning to the south and southeast well south of Madagascar. On March 22, Honorinina turned back to the south and dissipated within the westerlies.

Impact and aftermath
Early in its duration, Honorinina passed near St. Brandon, where wind gusts reached . The barometric pressure there fell to  during the storm's passage.

Before moving ashore mainland Madagascar, the cyclone brushed Île Sainte-Marie with gusts of  while also dropping  of rainfall over 24 hours. Heavy rainfall spread across the island, reaching  at Morondava along the west coast. Damage was heaviest in Toamasina, where the cyclone's winds struck for 30 hours. High waves broke off a  section of the port jetty, leaving it susceptible to future storms. The tides also washed away shipping containers and flooded a coastal road. The damaged port warehouses resulted in the loss of 4000 tons of rice and 990 tons of stored cloves and cotton, as well as 1,900 tons of coffee. Collectively, the lost stored product totaled around $17 million (1986 USD). Also in Toamasina, the cyclone damaged navigational systems, forcing the airport to close to all but light aircraft.

Outside of Toamasina, Honorinina damaged roads and rail lines connecting the city with the capital, Antananarivo. Several other roads were damaged by landslides or washouts, and many bridges were damaged. The high winds damaged or destroyed thousands of homes along the storm's path, leaving 83,885 people homeless. Many of the damaged homes lost their roofs, which resulted in additional damage when the heavy rainfall affected their interiors. The high winds also damaged many public buildings and factories along its path. The cyclone left widespread areas without water or power; the storm damaged electrical transmission and generation facilities. The high rainfall damaged dykes in Andromba and along the Ikopa and Sisaony rivers. Across the country, Honorinina killed 99 people, and caused 424 injuries. Damage totaled about $150 million (1986 USD).

On March 20, the government of Madagascar appealed to the international community for assistance, due to the heavy damage from the cyclone. In response to the request, various governments and international organizations provided assistance to Madagascar, including $490,000 from the European Economic Community for food and blankets, as well as $125,000 from UNICEF for medicine and building supplies. Catholic Relief Services donated clothing, rice, and milk from Caritas Madagascar. Countries that provided assistance included China, France, the United Kingdom, the United States, West Germany, Holy See, Mauritius, Canada, Finland, New Zealand, Norway, Sweden, Soviet Union, and Switzerland. Collectively, the international community provided $3.37 million worth of aid to Madagascar. The United States Pacific Command flew from the Philippines to Madagascar to deliver medicine. The nation had earlier helped Madagascar recover from Cyclone Kamisy in 1984 with housing rebuilding projects, and transferred materials due to the impacts from Honorinina to the Toamasina area. The Malagasy government also set up a National Relief Committee to facilitate relief efforts, including an initial inspection of the affected area to determine needs. Workers delivered about 19 tons of material to Toamasina and nearby Brickaville, including milk, blankets, and clothing. The World Bank estimated the cost for repairing commercial areas would be over $27 million (1986 USD). The agency also allocated funds toward repairing damaged power facilities, ports, roads, and airports. The International Monetary Fund also approved a $37.8 million loan to the country in 1986, half of which for emergency aid. Many houses and buildings had to be closed for repairs due to flood damage, including hotels, churches, and schools.

See also
Cyclone Geralda - powerful cyclone in 1994 that took a similar track, killing 231 people
Cyclone Gafilo - powerful cyclone in 2004 that took a similar track, killing 237 people
Cyclone Batsirai - powerful cyclone in 2022 that took a similar track, killing 123 people

Notes

References

Honorinina
Honorinina
Honorinina
1986 in Africa
March 1986 events in Africa